Ouésso is a large district in the Sangha Region of north-western Republic of the Congo. The capital lies at Ouésso.

Sangha Department (Republic of the Congo)
Districts of the Republic of the Congo